Gusztáv Bene (23 October 1911 – February 1993) was a Hungarian boxer. He competed in the men's welterweight event at the 1948 Summer Olympics.

References

External links
 

1911 births
1993 deaths
Hungarian male boxers
Olympic boxers of Hungary
Boxers at the 1948 Summer Olympics
Sportspeople from Békés County
Welterweight boxers